Pablo Ruiz is the first studio album by the Argentine singer Pablo Ruiz. It was released in 1987.

Track listing 

 Bongiorno, My Love, Te Amo
 Mi Locura Especial
 Todo Por Tu Amor
 Mi Chica Ideal
 El Amor Está De Moda
 Sol De Verano
 Te Amo, Yo Te Amo
 Somos Jóvenes
 Rock De La Inquietante Susy
 Por Favor Ámame

References 

Pablo Ruiz (singer) albums
1987 debut albums